George Miller (born 11 August 1998) is an English professional footballer who plays as a forward for Doncaster Rovers.

Early life
He is the nephew of referee Mark Halsey.

Club career

Bury
Miller joined the Bury youth set-up in April 2014. He made his League One debut for the Shakers on 7 February 2016, coming on as a 60th-minute substitute for Reece Brown in a 3–0 defeat to Barnsley at Oakwell.

He had a brief loan at Witton Albion, making two appearances and scoring one goal for the club. On 29 October 2016, he scored his first goal for Bury in a 3–2 defeat against Northampton Town.

Middlesbrough
On 14 July 2017, Miller signed a three-year contract with EFL Championship club, Middlesbrough, following a successful previous season with his former club Bury. Miller went on to make his debut for his new club on 19 September 2017 in a 2–0 victory over Aston Villa in the third round of the EFL Cup, coming on as a late substitute for Ashley Fletcher at Villa Park. On 5 December 2017, he signed for National League side Wrexham on a month-long loan, going on to make six appearances for the club. On 19 January 2018, Middlesbrough announced that Miller would rejoin his former club Bury on loan until the end of the season, despite reported interest from Wrexham to resign their former loanee.

On 16 July 2018, Bradford City announced that Miller had joined the club on loan for the 2018–19 season.

Barnsley
On 31 January 2019 Miller was signed by Barnsley for a fee of £200,000 and immediately loaned back to Bradford City until the end of the 2018–19 season. A few days later, he was announced as the winner of the December 2018 EFL Young Player of the Month award. 

Miller made his EFL Championship debut for Barnsley as a late substitute against Fulham on Saturday 3 August 2019 in a 1–0 win. However, first-team opportunities remained limited and on 22 August 2019, it was announced Miller was heading out on loan again, this time joining League Two side Scunthorpe United on a season-long loan deal.

Miller made just six substitute appearances for Barnsley in the 2020–21 season and on 31 August 2021 moved out on loan again, joining League Two side Walsall on a season-long loan deal.

Doncaster Rovers
On 20 June 2022, Miller agreed to join Doncaster Rovers on a three-year deal following his release from Barnsley.

Career statistics

References

External links

1998 births
Living people
Footballers from Bolton
English footballers
Association football forwards
Bury F.C. players
Middlesbrough F.C. players
Wrexham A.F.C. players
English Football League players
National League (English football) players
Northern Premier League players
Bradford City A.F.C. players
Barnsley F.C. players
Witton Albion F.C. players
Walsall F.C. players